Adrián Argachá González (born 21 December 1986) is an Uruguayan footballer who plays for Spanish club Centro Atlético Fénix as a left midfielder.

References

External links
 
 
 
 

1986 births
Living people
People from Durazno Department
Uruguayan footballers
Association football defenders
Uruguayan Primera División players
Tacuarembó F.C. players
Montevideo Wanderers F.C. players
Defensor Sporting players
Racing Club de Montevideo players
Club Atlético River Plate (Montevideo) players
Sud América players
Centro Atlético Fénix players
Argentine Primera División players
Primera Nacional players
Club Atlético Independiente footballers
Club Atlético Belgrano footballers
Central Córdoba de Santiago del Estero footballers
Segunda División B players
Tercera División players
CF Lorca Deportiva players
Uruguayan expatriate footballers
Uruguayan expatriate sportspeople in Argentina
Uruguayan expatriate sportspeople in Spain
Expatriate footballers in Argentina
Expatriate footballers in Spain